Aphodiinae is a subfamily of the scarab beetle family, Scarabaeidae. Members of this subfamily are known commonly as the small dung beetles and many, but not all, are dung beetles. These beetles are found worldwide.

These beetles are small scarab beetles, most less than 8 millimeters long. Many have small mandibles that are covered by a widened clypeus, the exoskeleton plate above the mouth. The feet are clawed.

This is a diverse subfamily with varied life strategies and habitat types. Many species are dung beetles, which collect and feed on animal dung. Other species are detritivores or saprophages, which feed on dead matter, and some are predatory. Some are known as inquilines, living in ant or termite nests, and some are sand-dwelling beetles. A survey of South American aphodiines found them in diverse habitat types including temperate rainforests, high-elevation Andean grassland, Patagonian steppe, coastal sand dunes, and subantarctic beech forest.

There is not full agreement on the taxonomy of the subfamily, but some classification schemes divide it into 11 tribes with about 280 genera and a total of about 3200 species worldwide.

Tribes
Aphodiini
Corythoderini
Didactyliini
Eupariini
Odochilini
Odontolochini
Proctophanini 
Psammodiini
Rhyparini 
Stereomerini
Termitoderini

Gallery

References

Scarabaeidae